The Italian National Agency for the protection and assistance of the Deaf (ENS) is an Italian non-governmental organization that acts as a peak body for national associations of Deaf people, with a focus on Deaf people who use sign language and their family and friends. ENS aims to promote the Human Rights of Deaf Italians, by working closely with Italy. ENS is also a member of the World Federation of the Deaf (WFD) and European Union of the Deaf (EUD, 1985).

History
The ENS was established in September 1932 in Padua, Italy, under the auspices of Ente Nazionale Sordomuti (ENS), the Italian Deaf Association. The first president of ENS was Antonio Magarotto, who was also, at that time.

Presidents
 Antonio Magarotto (1932-1950)
 Vittorio Jeralla (1950-1982)
 Armando Giuranna (1982-1995)
 Ida Collu (1995-2011)
 Giuseppe Petrucci (2011-2015; 2015-present)

See also
 Comitato Giovani Sordi Italiani
 European Union of the Deaf
 Federazione Sport Sordi Italia
 International Sign
 Italian Sign Language
 List of sign languages
 World Federation of the Deaf

References

External links
 

Deaf culture in Italy
Deafness rights organizations
Disability organisations based in Italy
1932 establishments in Italy
Organizations established in 1932